Île Toc Vers is a small island group off the north coast of Saint Barthélemy in the Caribbean. They are the northeasternmost of a series of islands which include Île Chevreau and Île Frégate. The Île Toc Vers group consists of three small rocky islands, aligned in a north–south fashion, between 15 and 43 metres in height. The largest island of the group is in the middle. It is situated within Réserve naturelle nationale de Saint-Barthélemy.

References

Islands of Saint Barthélemy